The National Academy of Science and Technology (abbreviated as NAST PHL) is the highest recognition and scientific advisory body of the Philippines under the Department of Science and Technology. It was created through Presidential Decree 1003-A issued by President Ferdinand E. Marcos in 1976 to honor and recognize Filipino scientists who made worthy contributions in the advancement of science and technology in the country. It also recommends individuals to be conferred the Order of National Scientist upon approval of the President of the Philippines.

History 
The establishment of the National Academy of Science and Technology was a proposal of several professors from the University of the Philippines. It was endorsed by the National Science Development Board (now Department of Science and Technology) to the President of the Philippines. NAST was created through Presidential Decree 1003-A issued by President Ferdinand E. Marcos on October 6, 1976. In 1978, President Marcos named the first ten members of the academy from members of the scientific community with three of them proclaimed as National Scientist, namely: Juan S. Salcedo Jr., Alfredo C. Santos and Gregorio Y. Zara. Through Executive Order 818 in 1982, the academy was tasked to give recommendations to the President of the Republic of the Philippines and the Cabinet on policies concerning science and technology in the country.

Mandates 
The National Academy of Science and Technology is mandated:
 To recognize outstanding achievements in science and technology as well as provide meaningful incentives to those engaged in scientific and technological researches
 To advise the President and the Cabinet on matters related to science and technology
 To engage in projects and programs designed to recognize outstanding achievements in science and to promote scientific productivity
 To embark on programs traditionally and internationally expected of an academy of science
 To manage, operate and maintain the Philippine Science Heritage Center

Functions 
The Academy's functions are the following:
 Recognition: As the highest government recognition body, it recognizes and supports works of different Filipino scientist that promotes advancement of science and encourages the youth to pursue science related careers. 
 Advisory: As an advisory body, it brings science closer to the people through awareness, promotes public participation on science issues and advises the government and non-government entities on science-related policies
Scientific Linkages: NAST communicates with other scientists inside and outside the country to promote collaboration and exchange of works, knowledge, and participation.
Management of the Philippine Science Heritage Center (PSHC): By virtue of Republic Act 9107, the NAST is mandated to manage the PSHC as a repository of all Philippine outstanding accomplishments in science and technology.

Organization and Membership 
Members of the National Academy of Science and Technology are nominated by members of the scientific community. Current NAST members deliberate on the membership of an individual, following strict rules and regulations. Once admitted to the organization, members are called Academicians (abbreviated as Acd.). The academy is divided into several divisions to which an Academician is a member depending on his area of expertise. The divisions are the following:
 Agricultural Sciences
 Biological Sciences
 Engineering Sciences and Technology
 Health Sciences
 Mathematical and Physical Sciences
 Social Sciences
From each division of the academy, a chair is elected to form the Executive Council. A president, vice-president, and secretary are elected from the Executive Council. The secretariat of NAST is headed by a director and implements the decisions of the Executive Council, and attends to the day-to-day affairs of the Academy. 
Currently, the NAST Executive Council is composed of:
 Acd. Eufemio T. Rasco, Jr., Interim President, Chair, Agricultural Sciences Division
 National Scientist Raul V. Fabella, Interim Vice President, Chair, Social Sciences Division
 Acd. Jose Maria P. Balmaceda, Chair, Mathematical and Physical Sciences Division
 Acd. Alvin B. Culaba, Chair, Engineering Sciences and Technology Division
 Acd. Jaime C. Montoya, Chair, Health Sciences Division
 Acd. Windell L. Rivera, Chair, Biological Sciences Division
 Acd. Arnel A. Salvador, Member

A Director heads the NAST Secretariat, which implements decisions of the Executive Council and attends day-to-day affairs of the Academy. The Secretariat is composed of two divisions, namely: Technical Services Division and Finance Administrative Division.

Academicians 

Members of the NAST are called Academicians. As of 2020, there are 77 living Academicians.

National Scientist 

All National Scientists are members of the NAST. As of 2020, there are 11 living National Scientists.

Corresponding Members

Honorary Member

Annual Scientific Meeting 
The academy conducts a scientific meeting every July since 1978. It gathers scientist from all over the country to discuss relevant issues related to science and technology and thus earning the distinction of the most prestigious Philippine scientific conference. At the end of the convention, NAST honors exemplary scientists from different fields and presents recommendations to the government through the secretary of the Department of Science and Technology.

36th Annual Scientific Meeting 
The 2014 Edition of the Annual Scientific Meeting (ASM) focuses on three pillars of competitiveness as defined by the World Economic Forum (WEF), namely, infrastructure, information, and innovation with emphasis on the policy and governance aspects in energy, water, telecommunications, and transportation. Former Department of Trade and Industry Secretray Cesar B. Bautista gave the keynote address.

List of Annual Scientific Meetings

Awards 

NAST also recognizes worthy contributions of Filipino scientists in the advancement of science and technology in the country during its Annual Scientific Meeting. It includes the following recognitions: Outstanding Young Scientists (OYS), The World Academy of Sciences for Developing Countries (TWAS) Prize for Young Scientists in the Philippines, NAST Talent Search for Young Scientists, NAST Environmental Science Award, NAST-LELEDFI Award for Outstanding Research in Tropical Medicine, Outstanding Scientific Papers, Outstanding Books and Outstanding Monographs.

Publications 
As a promoter of science and technology, NAST also publishes books and monographs based on studies of present academicians, members of the scientific community and world-renowned scientists. Conference proceedings of their annual scientific meeting is published as the NAST Transactions.

References

External links 
 Official Website of the National Academy of Science and Technology
 Presidential Decree No. 1003-A, s. 1976

Government of the Philippines
Scientific organizations established in 1976
Department of Science and Technology (Philippines)
Establishments by Philippine presidential decree